Wesley 'Wes' Mason (born 1941), is a male former cyclist who competed for England.

Cycling career
He represented England and won a gold medal in the road race at the 1962 British Empire and Commonwealth Games in Perth, Western Australia.

He was a professional rider from 1965 until 1971.

References

1941 births
English male cyclists
Commonwealth Games medallists in cycling
Commonwealth Games gold medallists for England
Cyclists at the 1962 British Empire and Commonwealth Games
Living people
Medallists at the 1962 British Empire and Commonwealth Games